Alfonso González Ruiz (born 21 September 1959) was a Mexican independent politician. He served as Deputy of the LIX Legislature of the Mexican Congress representing Nuevo León.

References

1959 births
Living people
Politicians from Nuevo León
20th-century Mexican politicians
21st-century Mexican politicians
Members of the Congress of Nuevo León
Deputies of the LIX Legislature of Mexico
Members of the Chamber of Deputies (Mexico) for Nuevo León